The Freedom Monument in Kaunas, Lithuania by sculptor Juozas Zikaras was unveiled in 1928 on the occasion of the 10th anniversary of the reestablishment of the independence of Lithuania. At that time Kaunas was the temporary capital of the state. The statue of the monument is also pictured on the obverse of the Independence Medal, also designed by Zikaras and issued in 1928.

The statue was designed by Zikaras while he was a teacher at the Panevėžys Gymnasium. According to the caretaker of the Čiurlionis Museum Rasa Ruibienė, Zikaras didn't have a workshop, so the director of the gymnasium, Jonas Yčas, former Minister of Education, allowed him to use a hall of the gymnasium. The reduced plaster copy of the statue was deposited at the Vytautas the Great War Museum in Kaunas.

Later the statue was cast in bronze in Germany, and inaugurated in its current location on the tenth anniversary of Lithuanian independence. The pedestal was designed by architect Vladimiras Dubeneckis.

In summer 1950, the monument was demolished by the orders of the Soviet government and the damaged statue was transferred to the History Museum.  In 1966 sculptor Bronius Petrauskas restored the statue and it was stored in the Čiurlionis Museum.  The monument was restored by architect Algimantas Sprindys and on February 16, 1989, restored to its original location. The total height of the monument is 12,35 m.

The plaster copy, restored by Jonas Stanislovas Juodišius, is located in the White Hall of the Presidential Palace in Vilnius.

In 2000, the statue is again pictured on the Litas commemorative coin for 10th anniversary of the second reestablishment of the independence of Lithuania.

References

Monuments and memorials in Lithuania
Buildings and structures in Kaunas
Objects listed in Lithuanian Registry of Cultural Property